The little tern (Sternula albifrons) is a seabird of the family Laridae. It was formerly placed into the genus Sterna, which now is restricted to the large white terns. The genus name is a diminutive of Sterna, 'tern'. The specific albifrons is from Latin albus, 'white', and frons, 'forehead'. The former North American (S. a. antillarum) and Red Sea S. a. saundersi subspecies are now considered to be separate species, the least tern (Sternula antillarum) and Saunders's tern (Sternula saundersi).

This bird breeds on the coasts and inland waterways of temperate and tropical Europe and Asia. It is strongly migratory, wintering in the subtropical and tropical oceans as far south as South Africa and Australia.

There are three subspecies, the nominate albifrons occurring in Europe to North Africa and western Asia; guineae of western and central Africa; and sinensis of East Asia (SE Russia to Japan, SE Asia, Philippines) and the north and east coasts of Australia and New Guinea

The little tern breeds in colonies on gravel or shingle coasts and islands. It lays two to four eggs on the ground. Like all white terns, it is defensive of its nest and young and will attack intruders.

Like most other white terns, the little tern feeds by plunge-diving for fish, usually from saline environments.  The offering of fish by the male to the female is part of the courtship display.

This is a small tern, 21–25 cm long with a 41–47 cm wingspan. It is not likely to be confused with other species, apart from fairy tern and Saunders's tern, because of its size and white forehead in breeding plumage. Its thin sharp bill is yellow with a black tip and its legs are also yellow. In winter, the forehead is more extensively white, the bill is black and the legs duller. The call is a loud and distinctive creaking noise.

The little tern was described by the German naturalist Peter Simon Pallas in 1764 and given the binomial name Sterna albifrons.

Populations on European rivers 

At the beginning of the 19th century the little tern was a common bird of European shores, rivers and wetlands, but in the 20th century populations of coastal areas decreased because of habitat loss, pollution and human disturbance.

The loss of inland populations has been even more severe, since due to dams, river regulation and sediment extraction it has lost most of its former habitats. The little tern population has declined or become extinct in many European countries, and former breeding places on large rivers like the Danube, Elbe and Rhine ceased. Nowadays, only a few river systems in Europe possess suitable habitats; the Loire/Allier in France, the Vistula/Odra in Poland, the Po/Ticino in Italy, the Daugava in Latvia, the Nemunas in Lithuania, the Sava in Croatia and the Drava in Hungary and Croatia. The status of the little tern on the rivers Tagus and lower Danube is uncertain.

The Drava population is one of the most threatened. Old-fashioned water management practices, including river regulation and sediment extraction, endanger the remaining pairs. Only 15 pairs still breed on extensive sand or gravel banks along the border between Hungary and Croatia. The WWF and its partners are involved in working for the protection of this bird and this unique European river ecosystem. The little tern is one of the species to which the Agreement on the Conservation of African-Eurasian Migratory Waterbirds (AEWA) applies.

Gallery

References

Further reading 

 BTO Little tern fact sheet
 Little tern - Species text in The Atlas of Southern African Birds
  (photographs)
 BBC Norfolk news item
 Little tern

little tern
Birds of Eurasia
Birds of North Africa
Birds of West Africa
Birds of Australia
Birds of Southern Africa
Nature Conservation Act endangered biota
little tern
Taxa named by Peter Simon Pallas